Barzanò is a comune (municipality) in the Province of Lecco in the Italian region Lombardy, located about  northeast of Milan and about  southwest of Lecco.

Barzanò borders the following municipalities: Barzago, Cassago Brianza, Cremella, Monticello Brianza, Sirtori, Viganò.

References

External links
 Official website

Cities and towns in Lombardy